Bălți County was a county (Romanian: județ) in Moldova from 1998 to 2003, with the seat at Bălți. Its population in 2002 was 506,300.

References

 Counties of Moldova, Statoids.com

Counties of Moldova
Counties of Bessarabia
1998 establishments in Moldova
2003 disestablishments in Moldova
States and territories established in 1998
States and territories disestablished in 2003